Bachmanniomyces is a genus of fungi with unclear classification.

Species:

Bachmanniomyces australis
Bachmanniomyces carniolicus
Bachmanniomyces muscigenae
Bachmanniomyces pseudocyphellariae
Bachmanniomyces punctum
Bachmanniomyces santessonii
Bachmanniomyces uncialicola
Bachmanniomyces varius

References

Ascomycota enigmatic taxa
Ascomycota genera